The 1993 German Figure Skating Championships took place on December 16–20, 1992 in Mannheim. Skaters competed in the disciplines of men's singles, ladies' singles, pair skating, and ice dancing on the senior and junior levels.

Senior results

Men

Ladies

Pairs

Ice dancing

External links
 1993 German Championships results

German Figure Skating Championships, 1993
German Figure Skating Championships